The 2022 season was the Houston Texans' 21st in the National Football League (NFL) and their only season under Lovie Smith, following the firing of David Culley at the end of the 2021 season. 

For the first time since 2016, long-time quarterback Deshaun Watson is not on the roster, as he was traded to the Cleveland Browns on March 18.

The Texans recorded their first tie in franchise history after tying the Indianapolis Colts in Week 1. However, the Texans struggled as they had their worst start since 2005. The Texans were eliminated from playoff contention in week 13, marking the third consecutive year the Texans were the first team to be eliminated. The Texans failed to improve upon their 4–13 record from the previous year, and posted a 9-game losing streak from Week 7 to Week 15, their worst losing streak since 2013. The Texans failed to win a home game in 2022, going 0-7-1 at NRG Stadium. Hours after the win against the Colts, the Texans parted ways with head coach Lovie Smith after only one season with the organization, marking the third consecutive year that the Texans have fired their head coach.

Draft

Draft trades

Staff

Offseason changes

Head coach

The Houston Texans fired first-year head coach David Culley on January 13, 2022, who most notably led the Texans to a win at AFC No. 1 seed Tennessee Titans.

Final staff

Final roster

Preseason

Regular season

Schedule

Note: Intra-division opponents are in bold text.

Game summaries

Week 1: vs. Indianapolis Colts

This was the first tie in franchise history.

Week 2: at Denver Broncos

Week 3: at Chicago Bears

Week 4: vs. Los Angeles Chargers

Week 5: at Jacksonville Jaguars

Week 7: at Las Vegas Raiders

Week 8: vs. Tennessee Titans

Week 9: vs. Philadelphia Eagles

This was played the same day as Game 5 of the 2022 World Series between the Houston Astros and the Philadelphia Phillies, moved back by one day due to rain in Philadelphia earlier in the week. Estimates from Nielsen Media Research show the baseball game drew an average of five million more viewers, with a share of at least 50 in both Philadelphia and Houston. Meanwhile, the football game, originally scheduled to air on the Fox affiliates in both markets per NFL rules, moved to the MyNetworkTV affiliates in both markets.

Week 10: at New York Giants

Week 11: vs. Washington Commanders

Week 12: at Miami Dolphins

Week 13: vs. Cleveland Browns

Cleveland quarterback Deshaun Watson made his first start since January 3, 2021 when he still played for Houston. Both offenses struggled throughout the game, with the game's only offensive touchdown coming with 1:57 left on a 6-yard Kyle Allen pass to wide receiver Nico Collins. However, Cleveland would score two defensive touchdowns and a special teams touchdown. With the loss, the Texans dropped to 1–10–1 and were mathematically eliminated from playoff contention for the third season in a row.

Week 14: at Dallas Cowboys

The Texans held a 23–17 lead entering the fourth quarter but fell apart in the final minutes of the game. Cornerback Tremon Smith intercepted a Dak Prescott pass and returned it 7 yards to the Dallas 4-yard line; however, the offense failed to score a touchdown and turned the ball over on downs. Starting at their own 2-yard line, the Cowboys marched 98 yards down field with Ezekiel Elliott getting the go-ahead score on a 2-yard run with 0:41 left. Houston attempted to respond, making it as far as the Dallas 44-yard line, but two false start penalties on Laremy Tunsil pushed the Texans back to their own 46-yard line and a Davis Mills Hail Mary pass was intercepted in the end zone by Israel Mukuamu, sealing the victory for Dallas.

Week 15: vs. Kansas City Chiefs

Week 16: at Tennessee Titans

Kickoff was originally scheduled for 12:00 p.m. CST, but was delayed an hour due to rolling blackouts in the Nashville area.

Week 17: vs. Jacksonville Jaguars

Week 18: at Indianapolis Colts

Standings

Division

Conference

Statistics

Team

Individual

Source:

References

External links
 

Houston
Houston Texans seasons
Houston Texans